Huntingdonian may relate to:

Huntingdon, a town in England
Countess of Huntingdon's Connexion, a group of evangelical churches